The Rolls-Royce 40 mm Cannon was a project first proposed in late 1938 to produce a cannon for mounting in aircraft which could cause sufficient damage to bring down a large bomber. It was envisaged as a suitable weapon for destroying tanks from the air. Experimental versions of the cannon were produced, including some with a magazine or belt feed for the ammunition. Examples were fitted to a Bristol Beaufighter and Hawker Hurricane for testing, although never used in action. Development of the aircraft cannon to iron out problems came to an end in 1943 when the Air Ministry lost interest in it and had started to favor the RP-3 rocket projectile as its preferred aircraft anti-tank weapon.

The gun was designed by Italian engineer Spirito Mario Viale at Littleover, Derby. The gun was tested on a small testing range at Sinfin near the Derby works without the usual precautions like red flags. Later trials were at an Army range at Manorbier of a gun mounted on a 30 cwt Morris truck (which by a fluke hit a target plane on its fourth shot) and at the Royal Navy's waterborne trials off Whale Island.

Although the Rolls-Royce 40 mm cannon was never deployed in aircraft, with the Fall of France in 1940 the Royal Navy found itself lacking armament in its coastal craft to respond to German E-boats. The Admiralty became interested in the development of the 40 mm cannon as a weapon that could knock out an E-boat. The first sea trials of the cannon were undertaken in September 1940 and it entered service in 1941 after teething troubles were ironed out. The "Rolls gun" was deployed mainly on motor gun boats which were used in action in British waters and the Mediterranean, where they were much used in the anti-aircraft role. Over 600 40 mm cannon were manufactured under sub-contract by British United Shoe Machinery (BUSM) in Leicester, since Rolls-Royce was forbidden by Lord Beaverbrook, the Minister of Aircraft Production, to tie up resources on them.

See also 
 Rolls-Royce Experimental Machine Gun – another Rolls-Royce aircraft gun design
 Molins Gun - QF 6-Pounder cannon used in de Havilland Mosquito "Tsetse" aircraft and Motor Torpedo Boats
 Vickers S a 40 mm gun used on British aircraft

Footnotes

Bibliography

 
 

Trial and research firearms of the United Kingdom
Naval guns of the United Kingdom
Aircraft guns
World War II artillery of the United Kingdom
Rolls-Royce
Weapons and ammunition introduced in 1940